Sunset Park is an amusement park located in La Libertad, El Salvador, on the Pacific coast.

History 

The park was inaugurated by Salvadoran President Nayib Bukele and Chinese ambassador to El Salvador Ou Jianhong on 26 August 2022. The park has five attractions which were donated by China: a ferris wheel, a pirate ship, a carousel, a roller coaster, and a jumping platform. The park officially opened the following day.

The park is a part of Bukele's plan to expand Surf City, which is nearby. The park was built with the support of the Chinese government.

See also 

 List of amusement parks in the Americas

References

Further reading 

 

Amusement parks opened in 2022
Amusement parks in El Salvador
La Libertad Department (El Salvador)